William Bell (May 28, 1780 August 16, 1857) was a Presbyterian minister, born in Scotland and an immigrant to Upper Canada. 

Bell and his family settled in Perth, Upper Canada, in 1817. He was a significant figure in promoting and expanding
the Presbyterian faith among the settlers in his region. He assisted in starting congregations in Beckwith Township, Lanark, Smiths Falls and Richmond.

His carefully constructed diaries and other writings provide an important insight into the interactions between the United Synod of Upper Canada (aligned with the Scottish United Secession Church) and the Synod of the Presbyterian Church of Canada (aligned with the Church of Scotland). In 1835 Bell left the former and joined the latter. The former was absorbed by the latter by 1839. In 1844 a large group withdrew from the latter, and formed a Free Church of Scotland Canadian Synod. However, Bell remained within the Presbyterian Church of Canada in Connection with the Established Church of Scotland. 

His son William Bell was a businessman and militia officer who gained some notability in Canadian history. Another son, Robert Bell, was a notable politician in Lanark County.

See also

 List of Canadian writers
 List of diarists
 List of people from Ontario
 List of Scottish writers

References 
 Biography at the Dictionary of Canadian Biography Online

Place of birth missing
Place of death missing
1780 births
1857 deaths
18th-century Canadian non-fiction writers
18th-century Presbyterian ministers
18th-century Scottish writers
19th-century Canadian non-fiction writers
19th-century Presbyterian ministers
19th-century Scottish writers
Canadian Presbyterian ministers
Canadian diarists
Canadian religious writers
Scottish emigrants to pre-Confederation Ontario
People from Perth, Ontario
Scottish diarists
Scottish religious writers
Immigrants to Upper Canada
Canadian male non-fiction writers
18th-century Canadian male writers
19th-century Canadian male writers
Ministers of Secession Churches in Scotland